Jacob Johnston (born May 23, 1988) is a former Canadian professional ice hockey defenseman. He last played for, and captained, the Odense Bulldogs in the Metal Ligaen.

Career statistics

Regular season and playoffs

References

External links

1988 births
Living people
Canadian ice hockey defencemen
Ice hockey people from Ontario
Sportspeople from Greater Sudbury
Utah Grizzlies (ECHL) players
Edinburgh Capitals players
Odense Bulldogs players
Cornell Big Red men's ice hockey players
Camrose Kodiaks players
Dalhousie University alumni
Texas Stars players
Evansville IceMen players
Greenville Road Warriors players
Canadian expatriate ice hockey players in England
Canadian expatriate ice hockey players in Scotland
Canadian expatriate ice hockey players in Denmark
Canadian expatriate ice hockey players in the United States